Rear end may refer to:

Buttocks, euphemistically
Rear-end collision, a type of road collision
An automobile's rear differential, colloquially
Rear End, a 1999 album by Mercedes

See also
Rear (disambiguation)